Jenga World Tour is a 2007 video game based on the popular Jenga game that was developed by Atomic Planet Entertainment and published by Atari, and released for the Nintendo DS and the Wii. It uses the standard gameplay of Jenga, but gives it slight tweaks in order to create different scenarios.

Development

The game was first announced by Atari on July 6, 2007, and a prototype of the Wii version was later exhibited at E3 2007. After previewing the game themselves in July 2007, GameSpot reported, "... we're not convinced that the finished game will be nearly as much fun as 54 wooden bricks."

Gameplay

Jenga World Tour uses the gameplay of the game Jenga, but different levels have different environmental factors that change how the game is played, such as a prehistoric Zambian jungle level where dinosaurs shake the tower as to make it fall. Some of the scenarios that were added include a Nepal "ice" level which makes blocks harder to grip, and a Chinese "vine" level which prevents some blocks from being moved. This aspect of the game has been criticized by reviewers since.

Reception

Jenga World Tour was universally panned by critics for its physics system and expensive price. IGN gave the Wii version of the game a 1.7 out of 10, saying, "We can't believe we're even listing off reasons not to buy a game based on a $10 box of blocks." GameShark gave the game a D- and reported that "... the game is an affront to everything good." GameSpot gave the game a 2 (terrible) rating out of ten, and stated, "Putting Jenga underwater does not make it worth twice the cost of regular Jenga." GameSpot also gave Jenga World Tour a dubious honor nomination for "Flat-Out Worst Game of 2007".

GamePro listed Jenga World Tour as number 5 of Top Ten worst games of 2007 featuring the CD of Jenga being thrown against the wall of a building destroyed by controlled demolition.

External links
 Jenga World Tour: Atari Official Website

References

2007 video games
Atari games
Dinosaurs in video games
Wii games
Nintendo DS games
Video games based on board games
Video games developed in the United Kingdom
Video games set in Nepal
Video games set in Zambia
Video games set in China
Video games set in prehistory
Atomic Planet Entertainment games